Benjamin Silver Jr. (died July 26, 1890) was an American politician from Maryland. He served in the Maryland House of Delegates in the 1884 and 1886 sessions. He served in the Maryland Senate from 1890 to his death.

Early life
Benjamin Silver Jr. was born in Harford County, Maryland, to Emily M. (née Pannell) and Benjamin Silver. His father was a farmer and served in the Maryland House of Delegates. Silver attended county schools and graduated from Lafayette College in 1877. He worked in the canning business in Harford County.

Career
Silver was a Democrat. Silver served in the Maryland House of Delegates in 1884 and 1886. Silver defeated William Benjamin Baker in 1889 for the Maryland Senate and served in 1890 until his death. Silver was chairman of the committee on railroads and canals. He was involved in the proceedings for the lease of the Chesapeake and Ohio Canal to the Washington and Cumberland Railroad Company.

Personal life
Silver married Fanny Howard Archer, daughter of Stevenson Archer on October 10, 1888.

Silver died on July 26, 1890, at the age of 32, from peritonitis at his home in Glenville, Maryland.

References

Year of birth missing
1850s births
1890 deaths
People from Harford County, Maryland
Lafayette College alumni
Democratic Party members of the Maryland House of Delegates
Democratic Party Maryland state senators
19th-century American politicians
Deaths from peritonitis